The Softball America Freshman of the Year is an award given by Wilson Sporting Goods to the best college softball freshman player of the year. The award has been given annually since 2019. From 2019 to 2020 the award was split into two honors, the player and pitchers of the year.

Winners

Freshman of the Year

Freshman Pitcher of the Year

References

Awards established in 2019
College softball trophies and awards in the United States